Caecum vitreum is a species of minute sea snail, a marine gastropod mollusk or micromollusk in the family Caecidae.

Description

Distribution
The Caecum vitreum has been seen in Galicia, Spain and in the Canary Islands.

References

Caecidae
Gastropods described in 1859